Park Gyeong-cheol (born January 23, 1969) is a South Korean sprint canoer who competed in the late 1980s. At the 1988 Summer Olympics in Seoul, he was eliminated in the repechages in both the C-2 500 m event and the C-2 1000 m event.

References
 

1969 births
Canoeists at the 1988 Summer Olympics
Living people
Olympic canoeists of South Korea
South Korean male canoeists